Milan Mikulík (born November 10, 1980) is a Czech professional ice hockey player. He played with BK Mladá Boleslav in the Czech Extraliga during the 2010–11 Czech Extraliga season.

References

External links

1980 births
Living people
BK Mladá Boleslav players
Czech ice hockey forwards
Rytíři Kladno players
HC Slavia Praha players
HC Karlovy Vary players
Sportspeople from Ostrava
Orli Znojmo players
HK 95 Panthers Považská Bystrica players
ETC Crimmitschau players
HK Dukla Trenčín players
HC Neman Grodno players
HC Slovan Ústečtí Lvi players
HC Frýdek-Místek players
HC Oceláři Třinec players
Czech expatriate ice hockey players in Slovakia
Czech expatriate ice hockey players in Germany
Czech expatriate sportspeople in Belarus
Expatriate ice hockey players in Belarus